UDP-galactose translocator is a protein that in humans is encoded by the SLC35A2 gene.

Variants of the SLC35A2 gene haven linked to mild malformation of cortical development with oligodendroglial hyperplasia in epilepsy (MOGHE), which is a subtype of frontal lobe epilepsy.

See also 
 Solute carrier family

References

Further reading 

 
 
 
 
 
 
 
 
 

Solute carrier family